Andrew M. Thompson (November 9, 1845 – February 17, 1895) was a professional baseball manager for the one season in the Union Association.

Born in Seward, Illinois, he served in the American Civil War as a drummer boy. Thompson died in Pecatonica, Illinois at the age of 49, and is interred at Watson Cemetery in Pecatonica.

References

External links
Baseball-Reference manager page

1845 births
1895 deaths
People from Winnebago County, Illinois
St. Paul Saints (UA) managers
Minor league baseball managers
People from Pecatonica, Illinois